Jack Roger Murphy (born 15 July 1995) is a Welsh former professional cricketer who played for Glamorgan County Cricket Club and Cardiff MCC University. He played as an all-rounder who batted left-handed and bowled left-arm fast-medium deliveries. He made his first-class debut for Cardiff MCC University against Glamorgan in April 2015.

In June 2019, Murphy was forced to retire from professional cricket due to a knee-injury at the age of 23.

References

External links
 

1995 births
Living people
Welsh cricketers
Cardiff MCCU cricketers
Glamorgan cricketers